The 1967–68 European Cup was the third edition of the European Cup, IIHF's premier European club ice hockey tournament. The season started on October 13, 1967, and finished on April 6, 1968.

The tournament was won by ZKL Brno, who beat Dukla Jihlava in the final

First round

 Dynamo Berlin,  
 Brynäs IF    :  bye

Second round

Third round

 ZKL Brno,   
 Dukla Jihlava :  bye

Semifinals

Finals

References 
 Season 1968

1
IIHF European Cup